Dr. Archie Carr Wildlife Refuge is a wildlife refuge located within the Tortuguero Conservation Area, in the Limón Province of northeastern Costa Rica.  The refuge is located north of the village of Tortuguero, between the Barra del Colorado Wildlife Refuge and the Tortuguero National Park.  It is named after Dr. Archie Carr, who set up the Caribbean Conservation Corporation in the same area in 1955.

The refuge is located on the Caribbean shore, and is the site of the John H. Phipps Biological Station, which operates a sea turtle-tagging program among other research activities on its beaches, as well as the Casa Verde Visitor's Center.

References

External links 
 Dr. Archie Carr Wildlife Refuge at Caribbean Conservation Corporation
 Dr. Archie Carr Wildlife Refuge at Costa Rica National Parks

Nature reserves in Costa Rica
Geography of Limón Province